= Sanitary Garden =

Art exhibition made of sanitary items

Coordinates: 30°43′46.274872″N 76°45′3.735352″E

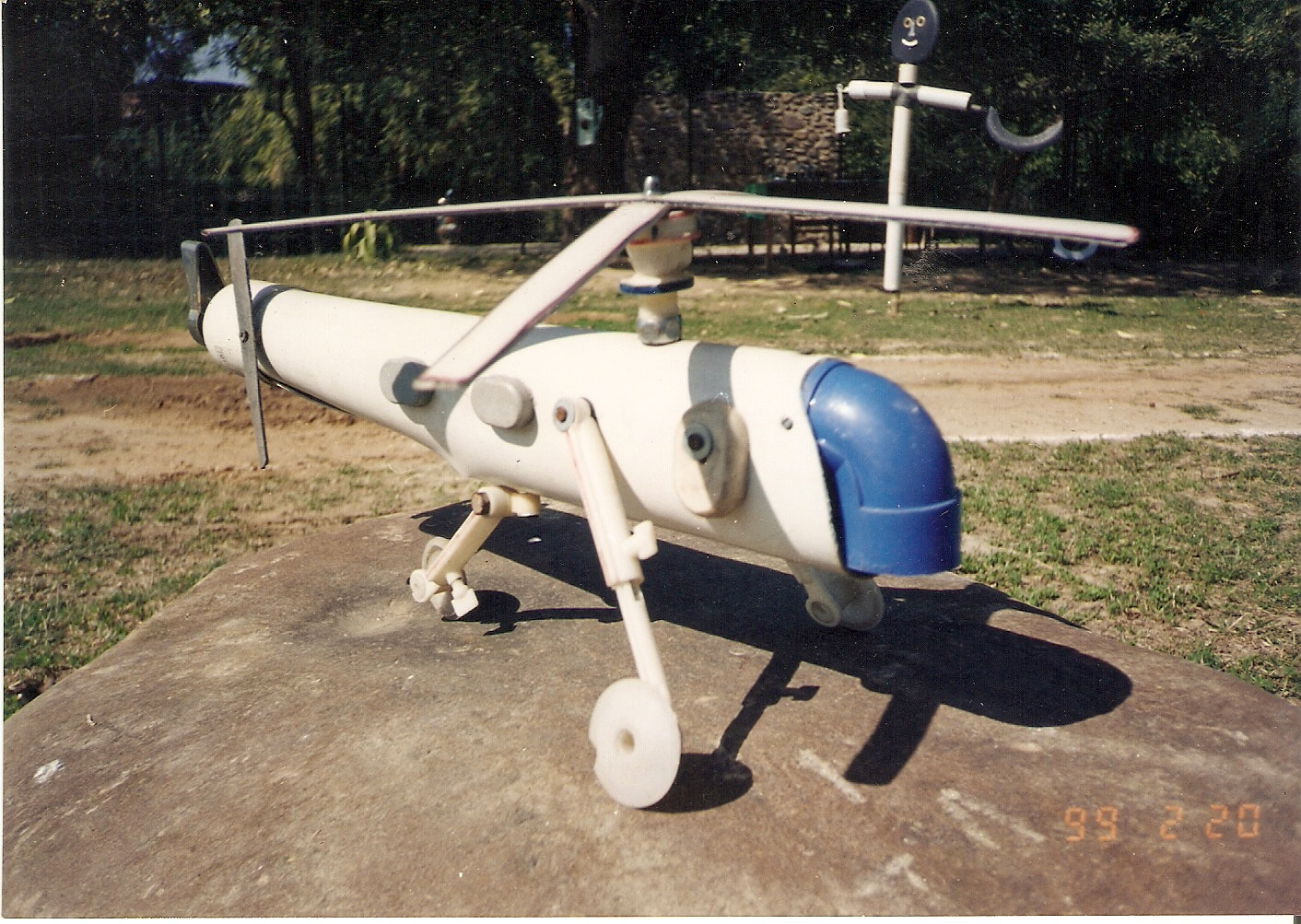
Airplane created purely from sanitary waste

The Sanitary Garden or Kala Sagar (lit. 'ocean of art') is an art exhibition in Chandigarh, India consisting of sculptures made from toilets and other sanitary items.

The garden is a unique government museum where the world's largest collection of art created purely from damaged or discarded sanitary items is exhibited. The collection of artworks was created by the artist Vijay Pal Goel, who founded the project in 1998. The Sanitary Garden is situated in sector 36-D, Chandigarh UT, India.

The main objective of the project is to generate mass awareness for the reuse of waste materials for environmental protection and to establish a tourist place for disabled people such as the mentally challenged, visually impaired and physically handicapped.

The artist was honoured by the Governor of Punjab with the prestigious State Award on Indian Independence Day in 1998 for his contribution to the field of art.
